| first           = February 23, 2011
| last            = March 23, 2011
| runtime         = 
| episodes        = 2
| episode_list    = List of Baka and Test episodes#Baka to Test to Shōkanjū Matsuri (OVA)
}}

, also known as Baka and Test: Summon the Beasts, is a Japanese light novel series written by Kenji Inoue with illustrations by Yui Haga. The series revolves around Akihisa Yoshii, the titular baka (idiot) and his friends at Fumizuki Academy, a school where students are sorted into classes based on their entrance exam test grades. The top classes receive better classroom equipment and benefits, while the bottom classes receive very little. Class F, the lowest class in the school, are angered by this injustice and vow to fight the higher-level classes for better equipment and respect. Baka and Test was published by Enterbrain, with a total of 18 novels published from January 2007 to March 2015 under its Famitsu Bunko imprint.

A 13-episode anime television series was produced by Silver Link, broadcasting from January to March 2010. This was quickly followed by a two-episode original video animation series in February 2011 titled Baka to Test to Shōkanjū: Matsuri, and a second 13-episode anime television series titled Baka to Test to Shōkanjū: Ni! broadcasting from July to September 2011. Baka and Test additionally received three manga adaptations published by Enterbrain in Famitsu Comic Clear and Kadokawa Shoten in Shōnen Ace, and a PlayStation Portable video game in December 2012.

Synopsis

Setting 
Baka and Test takes place at a fictitious preparatory school called Fumizuki Academy in Japan, said to implement "the finest and most unique systems." Its students are rigidly divided into classes based on their results in an entrance exam. Class A contains the highest scoring students, while Class F contains the lowest scoring students. In addition to this, the classes are given different perks and equipment based on this division. The higher the class, the better the benefits; Class A is filled with prestigious items like air conditioners, fancy seats, laptops, a free snack bar, etc. Meanwhile, Class F is forced to work in a dusty, broken classroom with mats and low wooden tables.

Additionally, Fumizuki Academy has a special system whereby all students are able to call forth Summoned Beings (Shōkanjū, or "Avatars" in the official English translation.) These Beings are able to fight when a teacher gives their approval - their strength depends on their most recent test scores in the approving teacher's subject (i.e. Math, History, etc.) The Being will lose points when struck by an opponent, and should their score reach zero, they are disqualified and must take remedial classes with the strict Soichi Nishimura, (nicknamed "Iron Man") which the students dread. If a student is able to leave the battle without their points reaching zero, they can take a supplemental exam to replenish their score, and return to battle. The primary function of these battles is the "Summoner Test War," where two classes fight with their Beings. The war ends when one class's Representative, the highest scoring student in the class, is defeated in a battle. If a lower ranked class is able to defeat a higher ranked class, they have the option to switch classroom facilities, giving the lower ranked classes a chance to prove themselves and earn better equipment.

Plot 
On the day of the placement test, Mizuki Himeji suffers from a fever and cannot complete it, and is thus given a score of zero, despite her intelligence. She is put into Class F, alongside the rest of the main characters - Akihisa Yoshii (the titular baka), Yuuji Sakamoto (the class representative), Hideyoshi Kinoshita (the bishōnen actor), Kouta Tsuchiya (the perverted photographer, sometimes known as Silent Ninja Pervert, Muttsurīni) and Minami Shimada (a transfer student from Germany who cannot read kanji.)

Akihisa is frustrated by the school's decision to place Himeji in Class F, believing she should've been given another chance at the placement test. He speaks to Yuuji, who also feels unfairly treated by the school's rigid system. They vow to prove to everyone that there's more to life than just test scores by taking down Class A and taking their classroom for themselves. This results in several Summoner Test Wars against higher-ranked classes. The show also loosely follows the love triangle consisting of Minami, Himeji and Akihisa, their crush. Meanwhile, Yuuji is targeted by Shouko Kirishima, a Yandere Class A student who fell in love with Yuuji when they were children.

Media

Light novels
Baka and Test began as a light novel series written by Kenji Inoue, with illustrations by Yui Haga. Enterbrain published 18 volumes from January 29, 2007 to March 30, 2015 under its Famitsu Bunko imprint; 12 comprise the main story, while the other six are side story collections.

Manga
A manga adaptation titled , illustrated by both Mosuke Mattaku and Yumeuta, began serialization in Kadokawa Shoten's Shōnen Ace with the June 2009 issue sold on April 25, 2009 and ended in the September 2016 issue sold on July 26, 2016. Kadokawa Shoten published 15 tankōbon volumes from December 19, 2009 to November 26, 2016. The English version of the manga adaptation is available on BookWalker. Another manga adaptation, titled  and illustrated by Koizumi, was serialized between the February 2010 and January 2014 issues of Shōnen Ace. Kadokawa Shoten published four volumes between August 26, 2010 and January 25, 2014. A third manga adaptation, titled  and illustrated by Namo, was serialized in Enterbrain's online magazine Famitsu Comic Clear between October 30, 2009 and August 12, 2012. Enterbrain published six volumes between May 27, 2010 and June 22, 2012.

Anime series

A 13-episode anime television series adaptation produced by the animation studio Silver Link, written by Katsuhiko Takayama, and directed by Shin Oonuma aired in Japan between January 7 and March 31, 2010. A two-episode original video animation (OVA) series titled Baka to Test to Shōkanjū: Matsuri were released on Blu-ray and DVD from February 23, 2011 to March 30, 2011. A second anime television series titled Baka to Test to Shōkanjū: Ni! aired in Japan between July 8 and September 30, 2011. Funimation licensed both seasons and the OVAs for distribution in North America. Both seasons have appeared on the Funimation Channel.

The first anime season's opening theme is "Perfect-area Complete!" by Natsuko Aso, composed by Kenichi Maeyamada. The first ending theme is "Baka Go Home" by Milktub and BakaTest All Stars and the second ending theme is "Hare Tokidoki Egao" by Hitomi Harada, Kaori Mizuhashi, Emiri Katou and Tomomi Isomura.

Video game
A PlayStation Portable video game titled Baka to Test to Shōkanjū Portable was released on December 13, 2012 in a regular edition and a limited edition box set, both in Japan only. The game is styled like a board game. There are nine characters to choose from—Akihisa, Mizuki, Minami, Yuuji, Hideyoshi, Kouta, Shouko, Yuuko and Miharu—with individual storylines of their own. In the beginning, only Akihisa, Yuuji, Hideyoshi and Kouta can be chosen by default. To unlock the other five characters, the other four characters must first be played in story mode.

In Baka to Test to Shōkanjū Portable, the principal of Fumizuki Academy, Tōdo Kaworu, has implemented a new summoning system in which students put their luck and skills to the test. If one student can win three stages in a row, they may choose a prize of their choice.

Reception 
The Baka and Test anime television series has received positive reviews, from fans and critics. Writing for Anime News Network, Carl Kimlinger gave both seasons of the anime a B−, praising the series' sharp comedy and style, while criticizing the writing of its female characters.

References

External links
Official website 
Video game official website 
Official website at Funimation

2007 Japanese novels
2010 anime television series debuts
2011 anime OVAs
2011 anime television series debuts
2012 video games
Anime and manga based on light novels
Bandai Namco franchises
Cross-dressing in anime and manga
Enterbrain manga
Famitsu Bunko
Fantasy anime and manga
Funimation
Japan-exclusive video games
Kadokawa Dwango franchises
Kadokawa Shoten manga
Light novels
Madman Entertainment anime
PlayStation Portable games
PlayStation Portable-only games
Romantic comedy anime and manga
School life in anime and manga
Shōnen manga
Silver Link
Television shows based on light novels
TV Tokyo original programming
Video games developed in Japan
Yen Press titles